El Pingo or San Julián is a village and municipality in Entre Ríos Province in north-eastern Argentina. The town was formed around El Pingo station.

Geography and Population
El Pingo is located in the center-west sector of the province of Entre Ríos,  from the city of Paraná;  separates it from Buenos Aires, the federal capital of the country.

The local population in the rural area in 1991 was 559, which grew to 679 in 2001. The population of the governing board's jurisdiction was 903 inhabitants in 2001.

Economics
El Pingo's main economic is the production of cereals using grains, such as corn, sunflower, soy, and sorghum. It also highlights the livestock activity.

Climate

Pampero and Sudestada winds occur often, and north, east, and west winds are less frequent.

Flora and Fauna
In this zone the existence of espinillos stands out, ñandubay, tala algarrobo, chañar, molle, and shade of bull. Previously this was an area of mountains that advanced to the center of the province.

References

Populated places in Entre Ríos Province